The interatrial sulcus, separating the two atria, is scarcely marked on the posterior surface, while anteriorly it is hidden by the pulmonary artery and aorta.

References 

Cardiac anatomy